Mekla is a town and commune in Tizi Ouzou Province in northern Algeria.

References

Communes of Tizi Ouzou Province
Cities in Algeria
Algeria